Koukou Franck Amégnigan (born 16 June 1971) is a former Togolese sprinter who competed in the men's 100m competition at the 1996 Summer Olympics. He recorded a 10.51, not enough to qualify for the next round past the heats. His personal best is 10.30, set in 1996. He was also a part of the Togolese men's 4 × 100 m relay team in both the 1992 and 1996 Olympics. The team finished 7th and 5th in their first heats, respectively.

References

1971 births
Togolese male sprinters
Athletes (track and field) at the 1992 Summer Olympics
Athletes (track and field) at the 1996 Summer Olympics
Olympic athletes of Togo
Living people
21st-century Togolese people